The Sulby Reservoir is the largest reservoir or lake in the Isle of Man, with an area of .

The reservoir
Sulby is an impounding reservoir. The water flows to Sulby Water Treatment Works, from where it is pumped to consumers.

Geography
The reservoir is located at the top of Sulby Glen near the source of the Sulby River, the longest river on the island. It is at the foot of Druidale; Glen Crammag; the valley of the upper part of the Sulby River; and a fourth, unnamed minor valley, receiving water from all these rivers. It is at the junction of three parishes: Michael, Lezayre and Braddan. It is operated by the Isle of Man Water Authority.

Use
The reservoir supplies the northern half of the island, St Johns, Peel, Kirk Michael, Ballaugh, Andreas, Bride, Ramsey and Laxey. Water can also be pumped to the West Baldwin Reservoir which supplies Douglas and the southern half of the island.

Water flows through a pipeline from the reservoir to the power station. The power station is also fed by another, smaller reservoir, Block Eary. An energy recovery system was installed at the Sulby Water Treatment Works in 2013, to generate hydro-electric power from the incoming water, which is then purified before being pumped on to customers.

Trout fishing is available and there is a large car park. It is also a registered dark sky discovery site.

References

External links
 Isle of Man reservoirs 

Bodies of water of the Isle of Man